François Duval (born 18 November 1980) is a Belgian rally driver.

Career

1999–2004

Francois Duval is the son of former rally driver Rene Duval. With victories in four events Duval won the Belgian Citroën Saxo Challenge title in 1999. He began his career as a rally driver at the international level; first, as a driver in the inaugural season of the lower-rung Super 1600 category of the World Rally Championship and later competed in the Junior World Rally Championship aboard a Ford Puma in 2001, the same year in which Saxo driver and future Citroën teammate Sébastien Loeb won the title. Beginning with the 2002 season, he progressed to become a regular driver of a Ford Focus RS WRC with the factory M-Sport-ran Ford World Rally Team. Concurrent with his World Rally Car exploits, he added a second campaign with the Puma in the junior series, taking a category win on the Monte Carlo Rally.

For the 2003 season, Duval found himself promoted to the role of regular Ford points-scorer in the manufacturers' championship, alongside Estonian youngster Markko Märtin after the double departure from the team of both Colin McRae and Carlos Sainz. He made a points-scoring debut on that year's Monte Carlo Rally, and as predicted by team boss Malcolm Wilson, collected his first world rally podium in Turkey later in the year. He retained his role alongside Märtin heading into the 2004 season, backing up the Estonian de facto team leader in a 1–2 early season surprise win on the first world series running of the Rally Mexico. However, amidst increasing uncertainty as to Ford's participation in future championship seasons, both he and Martin were released from their contracts at the end of the season.

2005–2008

Duval moved to reigning world champion manufacturers Citroën for the 2005 and a chance to partner recently crowned World Champion Sébastien Loeb and to drive the Xsara WRC. Unfortunately for Duval, this new partnership arrangement got off to an inauspicious start. A series of costly shunts, including on his Citroën debut from second place in Monte Carlo, led to an enforced two-rally leave from the cockpit for the Turkey and Acropolis rallies. Ironically Duval was replaced by the Belgian's idol, double world champion and immediate Citroën predecessor, Carlos Sainz. By late 2005, however, the Belgian appeared to be recovering his verve. After an initially tentative return, he was to storm to second place on the Rally Deutschland barred from victory only by the all-conquering Loeb. He added a fine second-place finish on the Wales Rally GB, somewhat ill-starred by the fatal accident that befell erstwhile Ford teammate Markko Martin's navigator, Michael Park. Then, at the 2005 Telstra Rally Australia, on the backdrop of the exits of podium challengers Loeb, Petter Solberg, Marcus Grönholm and one-off Škoda entrant Colin McRae over the course of the three legs of the event, Duval won his first World Rally Championship event, ahead of Harri Rovanperä and Manfred Stohl.

The immediate forecast for the Belgian's future remained clouded, however, with Citroën taking a one-year formal sabbatical from the series. Although 2005 teammate and now two-time champion Sébastien Loeb could revel in the luxury of a contract with the privateer Kronos outfit for all of the 2006 season's world rallies, as well as a testing package within the rejuvenated factory-backed Citroën C4 WRC, Duval proved unable to maintain a link to either organisation. Sporadic stints in a privately run Škoda Fabia WRC formed the platform of his eventual world championship campaign, with a best finish of sixth on the Rally Catalunya in Spain. Only two other top ten finishes were achieved all year, namely on the Italian and Turkish rounds, notwithstanding a late-season triumph in the same apparatus on his native non-world championship Condroz Rally in November.

Despite outstanding funding woes forcing him to abort a proposed campaign with the Fabia for the 2007 season, Duval's continued presence in the world series was ensured with a deal to drive a Kronos run Citroën Xsara WRC later in the season. He subsequently finished a close second to the Citroën C4-mounted defending title-holder, Loeb on the 2007 Rallye Deutschland that August. The result marked his first podium since his one and, thus far only, World Rally victory.

In the 2008 season opener, 2008 Monte Carlo Rally, Duval competed in a Ford Focus RS WRC 07 for Stobart VK M-Sport Ford. After a tight battle for third place with Subaru's Chris Atkinson, Duval finished fourth only 1.1 seconds behind Atkinson. He returned to Stobart Ford for the next tarmac rally, the 2008 Rallye Deutschland, and beat Ford factory team driver Mikko Hirvonen in the battle for the third place. After Stobart's Gigi Galli was injured in a crash at the event, Duval was signed by Ford as Galli's replacement also for the gravel events. For tarmac events, Ford promoted Duval to the factory team. In New Zealand, he crashed out from fifth place during the penultimate stage, but went on to continue his strong performances on tarmac, finishing fourth at the Rally Catalunya and third at the Tour de Corse.

During the 2008 season, Duval was performing on the Japanese circuit. On stage 6 of the first day, he went off the road and crashed into a concrete barrier, seriously injuring his co-pilot, Patrick Pivato. Pivato suffered both a fractured pelvis and a fractured leg as a result of the accident.

Duval announced his retirement from contemporary rallying, in March 2010. However, he changed his mind to compete in Rally Deutschland the same year in a Stobart Ford. He crashed during SS14 Arena Panzerplatte 2 and retired from 5th position.

In 2015 Duval was sentenced to 4 months in prison for his involvement in a car insurance fraud scheme.

WRC victories
{| class="wikitable"
! #
! Event
! Season
! Co-driver
! Car
|-
| 1
|  18th Telstra Rally Australia
| 2005
|  Sven Smeets
| Citroën Xsara WRC
|}

Racing record

Complete WRC results

Complete JWRC results

Complete Intercontinental Rally Challenge results

Complete FIA European Rallycross Championship results
(key)

Division 1

Supercar

Complete FIA World Rallycross Championship results
(key)

Supercar

References

External links

 François Duval official website
 Profile at ewrc-results.com

1980 births
Living people
Belgian rally drivers
European Rallycross Championship drivers
World Rally Championship drivers
24 Hours of Spa drivers
World Rallycross Championship drivers
Citroën Racing drivers
Comtoyou Racing drivers
M-Sport drivers
Škoda Motorsport drivers